Gionta is an Italian surname. Notable people with the surname include:

Brian Gionta (born 1979), American ice hockey player
Salvatore Gionta (born 1930), Italian water polo player
Stephen Gionta (born 1983), American ice hockey player, brother of Brian

Italian-language surnames